Yuka Nomura (野村 佑香; Nomura Yūka, born March 20, 1984) is a Japanese actress. She was born in Yokohama, Kanagawa Prefecture.

Filmography
  (1994)
 新生 トイレの花子さん (Shinsei toire no hanako-san) (1998)
  (2001)
 Kan-Kin (2001)

External links
Yuka Nomura official web

Profile at JMDb (in Japanese)

Japanese actresses
Seijo University alumni
1984 births
People from Yokohama
Living people